Doug Neubauer is an American integrated circuit designer, video game designer, and programmer best known for the logic design on Atari's POKEY chip and designing and programming the 1979 video game Star Raiders which became the killer app for the Atari 8-bit family.

The POKEY chip is one of three custom coprocessors created for the Atari 8-bit computers. POKEY handles potentiometer (paddle) controllers and the keyboard—the name is a combination of "POtentiometer" and "KEYboard"—as well as generating four channels of 8-bit audio. It also serves as the audio chip in many arcade games, such as Missile Command and Centipede.

Games
Wanting to create an action-oriented game inspired by Star Wars and Star Trek, Neubauer designed Star Raiders in eight to ten months while working for Atari, Inc. He reported that it took him six months to reach the highest player level during development.

In the early 1980s Neubauer moved from Atari computer line to the Atari 2600 because that's where the money was being made. He developed three cartridges for Fox Video Games under the pseudonym Dallas North: Megaforce, Alien (based on the movie), and M*A*S*H (based on the TV series). He was working on a game for Atari in 1984 to be based on The Last Starfighter film, but it was cancelled when Atari was bought by Jack Tramiel. In 1986, Atari Corporation showed new interest in the game, and it was published as Solaris for the Atari 2600. Despite being released for simpler hardware, the game is a spiritual sequel to Star Raiders that is more advanced than the computer original.

Neubauer's final two games for the 2600 were Super Football (1988) and Radar Lock (1989), both published by Atari Corporation.

He later was developing a game for the Nintendo Entertainment System with the working title of Solarian Patrol. The graphics were scanned images of spaceships  kitbashed from commercial model kits. The project was never completed.

References

External links

Giant Bomb

American video game designers
American computer programmers
Video game writers
Atari people
Living people
Year of birth missing (living people)